The following tables show results for the Australian House of Representatives at the 1998 federal election held on 3 October 1998.

Australia

States

New South Wales

Victoria

Queensland

Western Australia

South Australia

Tasmania

|abc

Territories

Australian Capital Territory

Northern Territory

See also
 Results of the 1998 Australian federal election (Senate)
 Members of the Australian House of Representatives, 1998–2001

Notes

References

House of Representatives 1998
Australian House of Representatives
1998 elections in Australia